Carnaubeira da Penha is a city in the Brazilian state of Pernambuco, 498 km away from the state's capital, Recife.

History
The unclassified extinct language Aticum or Araticum was spoken near Carnaubeira.

Demographics
The population in 2020, according with IBGE was 13,025 inhabitants and the total area is 1004.67 km².

There are Atikum and Pankará indigenous peoples living in reserves.

Geography

 State - Pernambuco
 Region - São Francisco Pernambucano
 Boundaries - Salgueiro and Mirandiba   (N);  Belém de São Francisco   (S and W);  Floresta    (E).
 Area - 1010.17 km²
 Elevation - 446 m
 Hydrography - Pajeú and Terra Nova rivers
 Vegetation - Caatinga hiperxerófila.
 Climate - Semi arid ( Sertão) hot
 Annual average temperature - 25.2 c
 Distance to Recife - 498 km

Economy

The main economic activities in Carnaubeira da Penha are based in agribusiness, especially creation of goats (over 80,000 heads), sheep, cattle, pigs, donkeys, chickens; and plantations of bananas, tomatoes and guava.

Economic Indicators

Economy by Sector
2006

Health Indicators

References

Municipalities in Pernambuco